Dr. B.R. Ambedkar College, established in 1973, is a college of Betai, Nadia district, West Bengal, India. It offers undergraduate courses in arts and commerce. It is affiliated with the University of Kalyani.

History 
Betai was a backward border-village full of jungles till the period of 70's. More than ninety percent people of the area belong to SC, ST, Backward Class and poor minority communities. Most of the residents in this locality are rootless refugee came from the then East Pakistan who settled here after the partition in 1947 and Bangladesh Liberation War in 1971. Those homeless people had an earnest urge to educate their children and for this they had set up this college. The college established by the help of local educationist Haran Chanra Biswas in 1973. A different building (Haran Chandra Smriti Bhawan) was made in his memory after few years.

Departments

Arts, Commerce and science

Bengali
English
History
Geography
Political Science
Philosophy
Economics
Education
Physical Education
Commerce
Mathematics

Accreditation
The college is recognized by the University Grants Commission (UGC).

See also

References

External links

University of Kalyani
University Grants Commission
National Assessment and Accreditation Council

Colleges affiliated to University of Kalyani
Educational institutions established in 1973
Universities and colleges in Nadia district
1973 establishments in West Bengal